WOVK (98.7 FM) is a radio station broadcasting a country format. Licensed to Wheeling, West Virginia, United States, it serves the Wheeling area.  The station is owned by iHeartMedia, Inc.

WOVK is one of the Local Primary 1 Emergency Alert System stations in the Wheeling area.

History
The 98.7 MHz frequency in Wheeling was originally assigned to WWVA-FM, which began broadcasting September 1, 1947. It was licensed to West Virginia Broadcasting Corporation.

As of 2022, local programming on the station consists of a daily live afternoon program hosted by cluster Program Director Corey Klug, as well as weekly broadcasts of OVAC high school football, which feature Klug as play-by-play announcer and Brad Mitchell as color commentator. Additionally, the station airs The Bobby Bones Show, After MidNite with Granger Smith, Country Top 30 with Bobby Bones, and The Crook & Chase Countdown from Premiere Networks, and utilizes the Premium Choice “Country Favorites” network during all other hours, which is hosted out of Baltimore, Milwaukee, Colorado Springs, New Orleans, Nashville, and St. Louis.

In the their 1990’s and 2000’s heyday, the station boasted an impressive lineup of local on-air talent and programming. Former disc jockeys include Steve Crow, Otis, Ken “Big K” Andrews, “Coffee Boy” Chad Tyson, Jamie Lynn, Skip Kelly, Rich Biela, Traci Fulton, Don Anthony, Scott Fisher, David Demarest, Kari Brooks, Charlie Mitchell, and longtime Program Director & Music Director Jimmy Elliott. The station’s former flagship morning program, Morning Madness, was consistently the #1-ranked morning program in the Ohio Valley from 1993 until its cancellation in November 2020.

References

External links

OVK
IHeartMedia radio stations